Filippo Boniperti (born 27 September 1991) is an Italian professional footballer who last played as a midfielder for Cuneo.

Club career
Born in Turin, Boniperti is a Juventus youth product. He made his professional debut for Juventus on 16 December 2010 in a Europa League game against Manchester City. His Serie A debut came on 22 May 2011 in Juventus' final game of the 2010–11 season, in which he came on as a substitute for Simone Pepe at the start of the second half. Boniperti was loaned to Ascoli for the 2011–12 season.

On 31 January 2013, he joined Parma, while Alberto Gallinetta moved to Juventus.

In summer 2015 he was signed by Alessandria. On 18 July 2016, he was released.

After his release from  Alessandria he rejoined Mantova.

Personal life
Filippo is the grandson of the late footballer and Juventus honorary president Giampiero Boniperti.

References

External links

Filippo Boniperti at football.it 

PrvaLiga profile 
gazzettadimantova.gelocal.it 

1991 births
Living people
Footballers from Turin
Italian footballers
Association football midfielders
Serie A players
Juventus F.C. players
Serie B players
Ascoli Calcio 1898 F.C. players
A.C. Carpi players
Empoli F.C. players
F.C. Crotone players
Mantova 1911 players
U.S. Alessandria Calcio 1912 players
Italian expatriate footballers
Expatriate footballers in Slovenia
Italian expatriate sportspeople in Slovenia
ND Gorica players
Slovenian PrvaLiga players
Italy youth international footballers